Ōwhango was a station on the North Island Main Trunk line, in the Ruapehu District of New Zealand. It served the village of Ōwhango, which lay to the north of the station. The Public Works Department transferred the station to NZ Railways on 9 November 1908, though bush had been felled along the railway route in 1904, by March 1905 a station yard was being formed and by August 1905 it was the railhead, with track laid  beyond to the south.

By 20 March 1908 there was a  x  passenger platform, a  x  shelter shed, with lobby and store, a tablet office, a loading bank, cattle yards and pens, a  x  goods shed with verandah, privies, urinals and 4 water tanks of  each, with water supplied by a hydraulic ram. A 6th class station, cart approach to the platform and fixed signals were added by 10 November 1908 and a sheep yard in 1909. In 1912 the platform was enlarged. In 1964 the timber platform front was renewed, but on 30 January 1965 the station building burnt down. By 21 July 1980 a building, with a brick veneer and a concrete floor, had replaced it.

By 20 March 1908 there was a passing loop for 48 wagons. In 1980 it was extended to an 82 wagon capacity. In 1910 a large timber mill and siding were built. Traffic in 1911 averaged 6 wagon loads a day. from 5 nearby sawmills, which cut matai, rimu and kahikatea.

Passenger traffic had ceased by 1976. On 2 June 1985 Ōwhango closed to goods too, though the crossing loop remains in use.

References

External links 

 1979 photo of diesel shunter alongside platform and station building
 Photo of 1980 station building in derelict state
 Photo of DL Class passing on 17 February 2018

Railway stations in New Zealand
Ruapehu District
Rail transport in Manawatū-Whanganui
Buildings and structures in Manawatū-Whanganui
Railway stations opened in 1904
Railway stations closed in 1985